Antoine Abrassart (born 5 September 1987) is a French professional football player, who currently plays in the Championnat de France amateur for Genêts Anglet.

Playing career
Abrassart played on the professional level in Ligue 2 for FC Gueugnon, making his debut in the 4–4 draw with Amiens on 16 May 2008. He has since played in the lower reaches of French football, representing Saumur, Villefranche-sur-Saône, Mont-de-Marsan and Dieppe.

Career statistics

References
 
 Antoine Abrassart at foot-national.com
 

1987 births
Living people
People from Saint-Dizier
French footballers
Association football defenders
FC Gueugnon players
Olympique Saumur FC players
FC Villefranche Beaujolais players
Stade Montois (football) players
FC Dieppe players
Ligue 2 players
Sportspeople from Haute-Marne
Footballers from Grand Est
21st-century French people